Garaway Local School District is an Ohio consolidated public school district serving the towns of Sugarcreek, Baltic, Ragersville, Dundee, Fiat and Barrs Mills.  Garaway is a member of the Inter-Valley Conference (IVC) along with East Canton, Hiland, Malvern, Newcomerstown, Ridgewood, Sandy Valley, Strasburg and Tuscarawas Central Catholic. Their mascot is the Pirates.

The district occupies five buildings: one junior high/high school (located in Sugarcreek) which houses grades 7-12, and four elementary schools located in Sugarcreek (Miller Avenue), Baltic, Ragersville and Dundee. The district is bordered by Fairless and Strasburg to the north, Dover and New Philadelphia to the east, Ridgewood to the south, River View and East Holmes to the west. In the 2008-2009 Ohio Department of Education School Report Card, the district was designated Excellent meeting 29 of the 30 academic requirements.

District History 
In 1960, Sugarcreek, Shanesville, Baltic, Ragersville and Dundee consolidated to create the Garaway Local School District.  The merge was a part of the state's plan to combine small school districts.  The name of the district was created by combining parts of the names of each district township (Sugar, Auburn and Wayne).

In 1990 the high school added a new gymnasium, locker rooms and several classrooms.

Prior to 1991 grades 6-8 were held in the Baltic Elementary building.  Today, grades 7-8 are held jointly in the high school building and grade 6 was re-incorporated into each of the four elementary schools.

Administration

District Administration 
 District Superintendent - Dr. James Millet
 High School Principal/Junior High Principal - Ryan Taggart
 Miller Ave Elementary Principal - Curtis Fisher
 Baltic Elementary Principal - Sedric Gerber
 Ragersville Elementary Principal - Sedric Gerber
 Dundee Elementary Principal - Curtis Fisher
 Athletic Director/Asst. Principal - Chip Amicone
 Director of Student Services - Brian Gibson
 Virtual Learning Coordinator - Charles Zobel
 District Psychologist - Michael Watt
 IT Tech - Nick Blackwell
 District Safety Dog - Sailor
 Speech Pathologist - Laura Goodall
 Attendance Officer/Security Guard - Jason Wallick
 Treasurer - Sheryl Hardesty
 Assistant To The Treasurer - David Yoder

Board of Education 
 April Beachy, President
 Mike Warkall
 Bob Eckert
 Bob Hannon
 John Shrock
 Dr. James Millet, Superintendent

Athletics

State championships 
 Boys Golf – 2004, 2007 and 2008

Runner Up 
 Boys Basketball - 2003, 2008
 Girls Basketball - 1994, 2008
 Girls (Cross Country) - 2014

Notable alumni 
 Schumaker, Robert P. (1992) - Professor of Computer Science at University of Texas at Tyler. Creator of AZFinText, a news-aware high-frequency stock prediction system.

See also 
 East Central Ohio ESC

References

External links 
 

School districts in Ohio
Education in Tuscarawas County, Ohio
School districts established in 1960